Jacques-André Hochart (29 July 1948 – 30 May 2014) was a French racing cyclist. He finished in last place in the 1973 Tour de France.

References

External links

1948 births
2014 deaths
French male cyclists
Cyclists from Paris